Piotr Józef Myśliwiec (born 21 August 1952 in Proszowice) is a Polish diplomat and chemist, serving as a Poland ambassador to Angola (2007–2010, and since 2015).

Life 

Piotr Myśliwiec was born on 21 August 1952 in Proszowice. He was educated at Tadeusz Kościuszko University of Technology, Faculty of Chemistry. In 1990, he defended his Ph.D. thesis on adsorption of water vapor at the Wrocław University of Science and Technology.

In the early 1990s, Myśliwiec joined the Polish diplomatic service. From 1993 to 2001, he held post of chargé d'Affaires a.i. at the Polish embassy in Abidjan, Ivory Coast. Later, he was in positions of Poland ambassador to Angola from 2007 to 1 September 2010. He returned on that post in July 2015. He is also accredited to the Democratic Republic of the Congo, the Republic of the Congo, Gabon, Central African Republic and São Tomé and Príncipe.

Apart from his native Polish, he speaks Portuguese, French and English. He has also basic knowledge of swahili and lingala languages.

References 

1952 births
Ambassadors of Poland to Angola
Living people
Tadeusz Kościuszko University of Technology alumni
Polish chemists